Alexandru Romalo may refer to
Alexandru Romalo (diplomat) (1892–1947), Romanian diplomat, economist and politician
Alexandru Romalo (judge) (1819–1875), Moldavian-born Romanian judge